Angela Roxanna Boyd (born March 9, 1968), known by the stage name B Angie B, is a rhythm and blues vocalist and dancer.

Boyd was notable as a backing vocalist and protégé for MC Hammer, in the late 1980s and early 1990s. In 1991, she recorded for Hammer's Bust It Records label. She also released a charting album and three singles of her own with the label. Subsequent albums were less successful commercially, but Boyd continued occasionally releasing music in the 2000s and 2010s.

AllMusic credits Boyd with exploring neo soul musical aesthetics within urban contemporary music, and described her as a forerunner to other African American female soul singers such as Mary J. Blige, Erykah Badu and Jill Scott.

Early life and education 
Boyd was born and raised in the small rural town of Morton, Mississippi. She grew up singing and honing her vocals in a local church. She graduated from Morton High School in the Scott County School District in 1984. A few years later, she and her best friend made a decision to move out west to pursue a singing/music career together. The friend ended up getting pregnant and Boyd relocated to Oakland, California.

It wasn't long after this relocation that Boyd was discovered by producer (and future husband) James Earley, and brought to MC Hammer's attention that Angie was a vocalist. Hammer is also the one credited with giving Boyd her stage name B Angie B, when Hammer said "just be Angie" one day.

Music career and personal life 
B Angie B sang on "Pump It Up (Here's the News)" from MC Hammer's Let's Get It Started album (the version re-released on Capitol Records in 1988), and she became a backup singer during his concert tours. During one tour, she briefly dated Mike Tyson. Her next opportunity came in 1989 with Hammer's female rap trio Oaktown's 3.5.7. She added her vocals to their rap song "Juicy Gotcha Krazy" from the album Wild & Loose, and appeared in the music video with the group. In 1990, she continued to perform background vocals for Hammer during his successful Please Hammer Don't Hurt 'Em album and tour period.

In early 1991, Hammer signed B Angie B to his Capitol-distributed Bust It Records imprint and soon her debut album was released, titled B Angie B. It was co-produced by Hammer and Felton Pilate, a former member of Con Funk Shun. In April 1991, the album debuted at number 11 on the Billboard Hot R&B/Hip-Hop Songs charts. It peaked at number 133 on the Billboard 200. The release of the album was led by the single "So Much Love", followed by two covers: "Sweet Thing" (originally by Rufus & Chaka Khan) and "I Don't Want to Lose Your Love" (originally by The Emotions). The latter was the album's biggest hit, reaching number 54 on the Billboard Hot 100. B Angie B toured with Johnny Gill around the time of the album's release.

In July 1991, she began dating Tyson again, while on tour with several Bust It musicians. She would later become a prominent witness in Tyson's 1992 rape trial. She also appeared in the Kid 'n Play farce Class Act and sang on the soundtrack's title track "Class Act (Work That Body)", which was also released as a music video. Late in 1991, Boyd left Capitol Records. Boyd released a second album in 1995 on the Bust It label (with an independent distributor). She dropped the first "B" from her name, performing as simply Angie B. The album release was preceded by the single "It's My Life". Neither the album nor the single charted. Nevertheless, critics identified her as a forerunner of neo soul R&B, which became more prominent over the course of the 1990s and beyond. Alex Henderson of AllMusic noted: "B Angie B did her part to bring soul music to a hip-hop/urban contemporary generation... She was doing that type of thing before the rise of Mary J. Blige, D'Angelo, Erykah Badu or Jill Scott."

After 2000, B Angie B (then amicably divorced from James Earley) returned to Mississippi. Boyd had one child, a daughter, with Earley. Her 1991 solo debut B Angie B was reissued in mid-2005 via Capitol Records. It included a bonus DVD, along with previous releases with Oaktown's 3.5.7. In the summer of 2009, she released new music via her Myspace account (myspace.com/bangiebmusic), including a remake of "Ring My Bell". In 2013, B Angie B signed a recording contract with Monarchy Records, a division of the Spectra Music Group. Her most recent album "Stronger Than Ever" was released on April 22, 2013. This project is a collaboration with Italian DJs Max Mazzeo and Dirty Old Boyz.

References

1968 births
Living people
American contemporary R&B singers
People from Morton, Mississippi
21st-century American women singers